My Womb Is Barren is an EP by Gnaw Their Tongues that was released on July 24, 2008 by At War With False Noise.

Track listing

Personnel
Adapted from the My Womb Is Barren liner notes.
 Maurice de Jong (as Mories) – vocals, instruments, recording, cover art

Release history

References

External links 
 
 My Womb Is Barren at Bandcamp

2008 EPs
Gnaw Their Tongues albums